George Townshend is the name of:

George Townshend (Royal Navy officer) (1715–1769), British naval commander
George Townshend, 1st Marquess Townshend (1724–1807), British field marshal, his nephew
George Townshend, 2nd Marquess Townshend (1753–1811), British peer and politician, his son
George Townshend, 3rd Marquess Townshend (1778–1855), his son
George Townshend (Bahá'í) (1876–1957), author, promoter of the Bahá'í Faith
George Townshend (priest) (fl. 1906–1947), Archdeacon of Clonfert and Kilmacduagh in the Church of Ireland
George Townshend, 7th Marquess Townshend (1916–2010), great-great-great grandson of the 1st Marquess

See also
George Townsend (disambiguation)